Mascarenhia subappendiculata is a species of beetle in the family Carabidae, the only species in the genus Mascarenhia.

References

Lebiinae